Kaitaa (Finnish) or Kaitans (Swedish) is an underground station on the western metro extension (Länsimetro) of the Helsinki Metro in Finland. The main entrance of the station is located at the eastern end of the block structure designed for crossing Kaitaantie and Iivisniemenkatu. The West Bank entrance is near Hannuskalli, where the preliminary land use plans have outlined further construction.

Kaitaa metro station is located in the northern part of the Iivisniemi suburb. Its architectural theme envisages lush Quarter courtyards, which refers to the characteristics of Iivisniemi. The station is opened on 3 December 2022, located 1,6 kilometres east from Soukka metro station and 1,3 kilometres west from Finnoo metro station.

References

External links
Länsimetro work in progress

 

Helsinki Metro stations
2022 establishments in Finland